Bob Wenzel (born October 4, 1949) is a former American college basketball coach and broadcaster for the Big Ten Network, ESPN, CBS Sports and Fox Sports.

Biography

College playing/Coaching career
Wenzel graduated from Rutgers University in 1971 with a degree in history, and headed to the University of Utah for his graduate work. In 1973, he earned his master's degree in education from Utah.

While at Utah, Wenzel began his coaching career as a graduate assistant. Upon graduation he moved back east and became an assistant coach at Yale, staying there for one season. He moved on to Duke in 1975, staying with the team through 1980 and playing an important role in the team's run to the 1978 Final Four.

After one season as an assistant at South Carolina, Wenzel was hired by Jacksonville University as its head coach. In five years at Jacksonville (1982–1987), Wenzel led his team to an 88–86 overall record, including an NCAA tournament appearance in 1986 and an NIT appearance in his final year.

During a 1985 home game against South Alabama, Wenzel suffered a near-fatal cerebral aneurysm. He recovered completely and returned to coach Jacksonville the following season. His return would earn him the U.S. Basketball Writers Association's Most Courageous Award for 1986.

Wenzel resigned to be an assistant with the New Jersey Nets for the 1987–88 NBA season, but returned to college the following year to be the head coach of his alma mater. Under Wenzel, Rutgers reached the NCAA tournament twice. The first of those appearances came in 1989, when the #13 seeded Scarlet Knights fell to Iowa in the first round. In 1991, Rutgers returned to the Big Dance as a #9 seed, but fared no better as they were defeated by Arizona State in the first round.

Wenzel also led Rutgers to two NIT appearances. The first of those (1990) saw the Scarlet Knights advance to the quarterfinals of the tournament, falling to eventual third-place finisher Penn State. Rutgers returned to the tournament two years later, but lost a close second-round game to Manhattan.

The 1991–92 season marked the last time Rutgers would finish with a winning record under Wenzel. The team struggled for the next four seasons - with a move from the Atlantic 10 to the Big East Conference in 1995 not making things any easier - and after an 11–16 finish to the 1996–97 campaign, Wenzel was fired and replaced by Kevin Bannon. He has not coached since.

Broadcasting 
Shortly after his firing by Rutgers, Wenzel jumped into broadcasting and was hired by ESPN as a color commentator for its college basketball coverage. Wenzel stayed with ESPN until 2013.

He added commentary for CBS in 2001, and worked for them during the NCAA Championship from 2001 until 2012.

Wenzel was hired as an analyst by the Big Ten Network in 2014.

Personal 
Wenzel is currently the Associate Head of School for Advancement at The Bolles School in Jacksonville, Florida. He and his wife, Neva, have three children and live in Ponte Vedra Beach, Florida.

Wenzel was inducted into the Suffolk Sports Hall of Fame on Long Island in the Basketball and Coaches Categories with the Class of 2004.

References 

1949 births
Living people
American men's basketball coaches
American men's basketball players
Basketball coaches from New York (state)
Basketball players from New York City
College basketball announcers in the United States
College men's basketball head coaches in the United States
Duke Blue Devils men's basketball coaches
Jacksonville Dolphins men's basketball coaches
New Jersey Nets assistant coaches
Rutgers Scarlet Knights men's basketball coaches
Rutgers Scarlet Knights men's basketball players
South Carolina Gamecocks men's basketball coaches
Utah Utes men's basketball coaches
Yale Bulldogs men's basketball coaches
Sportspeople from the Bronx
University of Utah alumni